Churchtown, historically known as Penns Neck, is an unincorporated community located north of Pennsville in Pennsville Township, Salem County, New Jersey. St. George's Episcopal Church was started here in 1714 by Swedish and Finnish settlers as a Lutheran church.

See also
 Trinity Church (Swedesboro, New Jersey) – Swedish Lutheran church at Raccoon

References

External links
 

Pennsville Township, New Jersey
Unincorporated communities in Salem County, New Jersey
Unincorporated communities in New Jersey
Swedish American culture in New Jersey
Finnish-American culture in New Jersey
Swedish-American history
Finnish-American history
New Sweden
Churches in New Sweden